Events in the year 1933 in Germany.

Incumbents

National level
 President: Paul von Hindenburg
 Chancellor:
Kurt von Schleicher (until 28 January 1933)
Adolf Hitler (from 30 January 1933)

Events In Germany

 30 January – Nazi leader Adolf Hitler is appointed Chancellor of Germany by President of Germany Paul von Hindenburg.
 1 February – Adolf Hitler gives his "Proclamation to the German People" in Berlin.
 27 February – The Reichstag, Germany's parliament building in Berlin, is set on fire under controversial circumstances.
 28 February – The Reichstag Fire Decree is passed in response to the Reichstag fire, nullifying many German civil liberties.
 1 March – Hundreds are arrested as the Nazis round up their political opponents.
 5 March –  German federal election, March 1933: National Socialists gain 43.9% of the votes.
 8 March –  Nazis occupy the Bavarian State Parliament and expel deputies.
 12 March – Hindenburg bans the flag of the republic and orders the Imperial and Nazi flag to fly side by side.
 15 March – Hitler proclaims the Third Reich.
 20 March – Dachau, the first Nazi concentration camp, is completed (it opens 22 March).
 21 March – Jewish organizations announce an economic boycott of German goods.
 23 March – The Reichstag passes the Enabling Act ("The law for removing the distress of people and the Reich"), making Adolf Hitler dictator of Germany, curbing its own power.
 26 March – Air minister Hermann Göring denies that Germany's Jews are in danger.

 1 April – The recently elected Nazis under Julius Streicher organise a one-day boycott of all Jewish-owned businesses in Germany.
 7 April – The Law for the Restoration of the Professional Civil Service is passed, forcing all "non-Aryans" to retire from the legal profession and civil service.
 21 April – Germany outlaws the kosher ritual shechita.   
 26 April – The Gestapo is established in Germany.
 27 April – Der Stahlhelm veterans organisation joins the Nazi Party.

 10 May – Nazi book burnings are staged publicly throughout Germany.
 26 May – The Nazi Party introduces a law to legalise eugenic sterilisation.
 2 June – The Nazi authorities form the 'Expert Committee on Questions of Population and Racial Policy' under Reich Interior Minister Wilhelm Frick.
 21 June – All non-Nazi political parties are forbidden.
 25 June – The Wilmersdorfer Tennishallen delegates convene in Berlin to protest against the persecution of Jehovah's Witnesses in Nazi Germany.
 14 July – Forming new political parties is forbidden. The Law for the Prevention of Hereditarily Diseased Offspring is implemented.
 20 July – Signing of the Reichskonkordat between the Vatican and Nazi Germany. 
 23 August – The Nazis publish the first of the four lists of people whose German citizenship, passports and other privileges are withdrawn. On the first list of thirty-three names are the Jewish authors Heinrich Mann, Lion Feuchtwanger, Ernst Toller and Kurt Tucholsky.
 25 August – The Haavara Agreement is signed between Nazi Germany, the Zionist Federation of Germany and the Anglo-Palestine Bank, allowing approximately 60,000 German Jews to leave Germany and move to Palestine.
 30 August–3 September – The 5th Nazi Party Congress is held in Nuremberg and is called the "Rally of Victory" (Reichsparteitag des Sieges) in reference to the Nazi seizure of power
 16 October – Germany officially announces its intention to leave the League of Nations.

Births
 3 March - Gerhard Mayer-Vorfelder,  German Vice President of the Union of European Football Associations (died 2015)
 5 March - Walter Kasper, German cardinal of Roman-Catholic Church
 6 March - Willy Schäfer, German actor (died 2011)
 7 March - Hannelore Kohl, first wife of German Chancellor Helmut Kohl (died 2001)
 9 March - Reinhard Lettmann, bishop of the Roman Catholic Church (died 2013)
 14 March - Duke Carl Gregor of Mecklenburg, German nobleman and musician (died 2018)
 20 March — Michael Pfleghar, German film director and screenwriter (died 1991)
 7 April - Johannes Schaaf, German film and theatre director (died 2019)
 15 May — Ursula Schleicher, German politician and harpist
 29 May — Helmuth Rilling, German choral conductor
 8 June — Ernst W. Hamburger, German-born Brazilian physicist (died 2018)
 3 July - Maximilian, Margrave of Baden, German nobleman (died 2022)
 5 July — Michael Heltau, German actor and singer
 11 July — Ernst Jacobi, German actor (died 2022)
 14 July - Franz, Duke of Bavaria, German nobleman
 15 July - Manfred Homberg, German boxer (died 2010)
 16 July - Heinz Dürr, German entrepreneur
 6 August - Ulrich Biesinger, German footballer (died 2011)
 16 August - Reiner Kunze, German writer
 10 September — Karl Lagerfeld, German fashion designer (died 2019)
 20 September — Alois Graf von Waldburg-Zeil, German politician (died 2014)
 14 October - Wilfried Dietrich German wrestler (died 1992)
 23 October — Yigal Tumarkin, German-born Israeli painter and sculptor (died 2021)
 30 October - Johanna von Koczian, German actress
 6 November — Else Ackermann, German physician, pharmacologist and politician (died 2019)
 9 November - Renate Ewert, German acress (died 1966)
 13 November - Peter Härtling, German writer, poet, publisher and journalist (died 2017)
 20 November - Hermann von Richthofen, German diplomat (died 2021)
 4 December - Horst Buchholz, German actor (died 2003)

Deaths 
 3 January — Wilhelm Cuno, German politician and former Chancellor of Germany (born 1876)
 1 February - Gustav Lilienthal, German social reformer (born 1849)
 14 February – Carl Correns, German botanist and geneticist (born 1864)
 24 February - Johannes Meisenheimer, German zoologist (born 1873)
 26 February - Princess Thyra of Denmark, Crown Princess of Hanover (born 1853 in Denmark)
 12 April - Andreas Blunck, German politician (born 1871)
 24 April - Wilhelm von Schoen, German diplomat (born 1851)
 27 May  - James Loeb, German banker (born 1867)
 24 July - Max von Schillings, German conductor (born 1868)
 7 September — Max Adalbert, German actor (born 1874)
 9 September - Friedrich Fülleborn, German physician who specialized in tropical medicine and parasitology (born 1866)
 14 September - Theodor Rocholl, Gemran painter (born 1854)
 11 October — Reinhold Tiling, German engineer (born 1893)
 19 October - Heinrich Brauns, politician (born 1868)
 25 October - Friedrich Heinrich Albert Wangerin, German mathematician (born 1844)
 26 November - Franz Bracht, German politician (born 1877)
 4 December - Stefan George, German symbolist poet (born 1868)
 9 December - Julius Falkenstein, German actor (born 1879)

References

 
Years of the 20th century in Germany
Germany
Germany